Limnaecia magnifica is a moth in the family Cosmopterigidae. It is found in Pakistan.

References

Natural History Museum Lepidoptera generic names catalog

Limnaecia
Moths described in 1968
Moths of Asia